General Engineering Company may refer to:

 General Engineering & Dry Dock Company, a shipbuilding company in Alameda, California, United States which was named General Engineering Company before 1923
 General Engineering Company of Ontario (GECO), a munitions plant in Scarborough, Ontario, Canada